Lynne Meadow is an American theatre producer, director and a teacher. She has been the artistic director of the Manhattan Theatre Club since 1972.

Career
A cum laude graduate of Bryn Mawr, Meadow attended the Yale School of Drama.

In 1972 she joined the Manhattan Theatre Club as Artistic Director, and in that position she has directed and produced more than 450 New York City and world premieres of plays by American and international playwrights, including Terrence McNally, Beth Henley, John Guare, Athol Fugard, Brian Friel, Harold Pinter, Alan Ayckbourn, and John Patrick Shanley.

Under Meadow's leadership, MTC has been honored with every prestigious theatre award, including nineteen Tony Awards, six Pulitzer Prizes for Drama, 48 Obie Awards, and 32 Drama Desk Awards, as well as New York Drama Critics' Circle Awards, Outer Critics Circle Awards, and Theatre World Awards. In 2013, she was inducted into the American Theater Hall of Fame.

Meadow's directing credits include Sally and Marsha, and The Commons of Pensacola (2013).

Meadow has taught at Yale University, Fordham University, NYU, Circle in the Square Theatre School, and Stony Brook University.

Personal
She is married to attorney Ronald Shechtman.

Education
Bryn Mawr Board of Trustees
Herbert Brodkin Fellow at Yale

Awards
Lucille Lortel Award for Lifetime Achievement
Lilly Award for Lifetime Achievement
Museum of the City of New York’s Auchincloss Prize
Lee Reynolds Award from the League of Professional Theatre Women
Manhattan Award from Manhattan magazine
Person of the Year from the National Theatre Conference
Margo Jones Award
Mr. Abbot award for Lifetime Achievement from the Stage Directors Foundation
She has twice been nominated for Best Director at the Drama Desk Awards: in 1996 for Leslie Ayvazian’s Nine Armenians and in 1988 for Alan Ayckbourn’s Woman in Mind with Stockard Channing.

Directing credits
Sources: Internet Off-Broadway Database; Internet Broadway Database

1974: Mark Medoff’s The Wager
1974: Corinne Jacker’s Bits and Pieces
1975: Clifford Odets’ Golden Boy
1976: The Pokey
1977: David Rudkin's Ashes (Obie Award)
1978: Istvan Orkeny's Catsplay
1979: Joanna M. Glass’ Artichoke
1979: David Edgar's The Jail Diary of Albie Sachs
1980: S.N. Behrman's Biography
1980: Steve Metcalf's Vikings
1982: Anton Chekhov's Three Sisters
1984: Israel Horovitz's Park Your Car in Harvard Yard
1986: Richard Nelson's Principia Scriptoriae
1988: Alan Ayckbourn's Woman in Mind (Drama Desk nomination, Best Director)
1989: Lee Blessing's Eleemosynary
1992: Alan Ayckbourn's A Small Family Business
1996: Leslie Ayvazian's Nine Armenians (Drama Desk nomination)
1999: Frederick Freyer and Patrick Cook's Captains Courageous
2001: Melanie Marnich's Blur
2003: Neil Simon's Rose's Dilemma
2003: Marsha Norman's Last Dance
2005: Ron Hutchinson's Moonlight and Magnolias
2006: David Greig's The American Pilot
2007: Charles Busch's Our Leading Lady
2010: Donald Margulies’ Collected Stories
2011: Margaret Edson's Wit
2013: Richard Greenberg's The Assembled Parties

Selected world/New York premieres produced under Meadows' artistic direction
Sources: Internet Off-Broadway Database; Internet Broadway database

1988: Richard Greenberg’s Eastern Standard
1993: Charlayne Woodard’s Pretty Fire
1993: Athol Fugard’s Playland
1995: A.R. Gurney’s Sylvia
2004: Donald Margulies’ Sight Unseen (Pulitzer Prize finalist)
2006: Conor McPherson’s Shining City
2007: Alfred Uhry’s LoveMusik suggested by the letters of Kurt Weill and Lotte Lenya
2007: David Harrower’s Blackbird
2009: George S. Kaufman’s and Edna Ferber’s The Royal Family
2009: Lynn Nottage’s Ruined (Pulitzer Prize)
2009: Donald Margulies’ Time Stands Still (play)
2010: Lee Hall’s The Pitmen Painters
2011: David Lindsay-Abaire’s Good People
2012: David Auburn’s The Columnist

References

External links
 
 

American theatre managers and producers
American theatre directors
Women theatre directors
Yale School of Drama alumni
Bryn Mawr College alumni
Living people
Year of birth missing (living people)